Johann II Bernoulli (18 May 1710, in Basel – 17 July 1790, in Basel; also known as Jean) was the youngest of the three sons of the Swiss mathematician Johann Bernoulli. He studied law and mathematics, and, after travelling in France, was for five years professor of eloquence in the university of his native city. In 1736 he was awarded the prize of the French Academy for his suggestive studies of aether. On the death of his father he succeeded him as professor of mathematics in the University of Basel. He was thrice a successful competitor for the prizes of the Academy of Sciences of Paris. His prize subjects were the capstan, the propagation of light, and the magnet. He enjoyed the friendship of P. L. M. de Maupertuis, who died under his roof while on his way to Berlin. He himself died in 1790. His two sons, Johann and Jakob, are the last noted mathematicians of the Bernoulli family.

References

External links

1710 births
1790 deaths
Scientists from Basel-Stadt
18th-century Swiss mathematicians
Members of the French Academy of Sciences  
Swiss Calvinist and Reformed Christians
Johann II